Neutelings Riedijk Architects is an architecture firm based in Rotterdam, the Netherlands, founded by Willem Jan Neutelings and Michiel Riedijk in 1987.

Work and design philosophy

The work of Neutelings Riedijk Architects has been characterized as having a sculptural, often anthropomorphic quality and a playfulness of form while following a clear rationality in programming and context. Their use of familiar forms and materials grounds the strangeness and baroque involutions that give the works a distinct identity and power. Because of the public nature of most of their work, Neutelings Riedijk see the sculptural quality as a way to communicate the building's role within its urban or social context.

Neutelings Riedijk Architects' earlier work consists mostly of public housing and utilitarian buildings such as office buildings, fire stations, and hotels. They have since moved on to designing complex assignments for public and cultural institutions such as museums, libraries, performing arts venues, concert halls, and educational facilities. Their most acclaimed buildings are the Naturalis Biodiversity Center in Leiden (2019), City Hall Deventer (2016), Museum aan de Stroom in Antwerp (2010), the Netherlands Institute for Sound and Vision in Hilversum (2006), the Shipping and Transport College Group in Rotterdam (2005), and the culture house Rozet in Arnhem (2013) and Culture House Eemhuis in Amersfoort (2013).

Selected projects

Realized projects
Naturalis Biodiversity Center | Leiden, The Netherlands (2019)
Flemish Government | Herman Teirlinck Building | Brussels, Belgium (2017)
City Hall and Offices | Deventer, The Netherlands (2017)
Cultural Center | Rozet | Arnhem, The Netherlands (2013)
Cultural Center & Library | Culture House Eemhuis | Amersfoort, The Netherlands (2013) 
Museum aan de Stroom | MAS | Antwerp, Belgium (2010) 
Dutch Tax Office | Walterboscomplex | Apeldoorn, The Netherlands (2007) 
Museum and archives | Netherlands Institute for Sound and Vision | Hilversum, The Netherlands (2006) 
Shipping and Transport College Group | Rotterdam, The Netherlands (2005) 
Lake Side Housing | The Sphinxes | Huizen, The Netherlands (2003) 
Theatre & Art Centre | STUK | Leuven, Belgium (2002) 
University Building | Minnaert | Utrecht, The Netherlands (1997)

Current projects
Gare Maritime | Brussels
Amsterdam Museum | Amsterdam
ZIL Factory | Moscow
Heldentoren apartments | Knokke
Lorentz Phase 2  | Leiden
Ninoofse poort | Brussels
Urban Interactive District | Amsterdam

Competition projects
Huis van Stad en Regio | Dordrecht, Netherlands | City of Dordrecht | competition | 2020
Louvre Collection Depot | Lévien, France | Louvre Museum | competition | 2015
Porsche Design Tower | Frankfurt, Germany | competition | 2015
Concert Hall, Dance Hall, Theatre, Conservatory | Spuiforum | City of The Hague | The Hague, The Netherlands | international invited competition, first prize | 2014
Adidas World of Sports | Herzogenaurach, Germany | competition | 2014
Museum Boijmans van Beuningen Collection Building | Rotterdam, The Netherlands | competition | 2013
Hotel Areal InterContinental | Vienna, Austria | WertInvest | competition | 2013 
Office Building Le Cinq | Paris, France | NV Buelens | competition second prize | 2012
Museum | Moscow, Russia | Polytechnic Museum Development Foundation | competition | 2011
Museum | Narbonne, France | City of Narbonne | competition | 2011
Opera & Ballet Theatre | Perm, Russia | competition second prize | 2010
Concert Hall | Ljubljana, Slovenia | competition first prize | 2010
Museum of European History | Brussels, Belgium | competition | 2010
Flagship Store Valentin Yudashkin | Moscow, Russia | invited competition | 2008
Forum for Music & Dance | Ghent, Belgium | City of Ghent | competition first prize | 2004

Selected publications
 Ornament & Identity – Neutelings Riedijk 2018. 
 El Croquis 159 – Neutelings Riedijk 2003–2012, Levene, R. (ed.), Madrid 2012. 
 The MAS Revealed 2007–2011, Grooten S., Heylen P., Steverlynck S., Schoten 2011. 
 The Making of the MAS 1995–2010, Neutelings WJ., Steverlynck S., Vermeulen P., Schoten 2011. 
 Neutelings Riedijk Architects, Sanguigni G., Rome 2011. 
 Beeld en Geluid – Sound and Vision, Keuning D., Amsterdam 2007. 
 Aan het Werk, Neutelings WJ., Riedijk M., Rotterdam 2004. 
 At Work, Neutelings WJ., Riedijk M., Rotterdam 2004. 
 El Croquis 94 – Neutelings Riedijk 1992–1999, Levene, R. (ed.), Madrid 1999. 
 Minnaertgebouw Universiteit Utrecht, Neutelings WJ., Weegers Th., Rotterdam 1998.

Selected awards and honours
Nomination Mies van der Rohe Award | for Rozet Arnhem | 2015
Arc14 Award Best Dutch Interior Design | for Rozet Arnhem | 2014
Best New Dutch Building of the Year Award | for Rozet Arnhem | 2014
Heuvelink Prize 2014 | for Rozet Arnhem | 2014
Best Library of 2013 | for Rozet Arnhem | 2013
Belgium Steel Construction Award | for MAS Museum aan de Stroom | 2012
AIT Award | for MAS Museum aan de Stroom | 2012
Nomination Mies van der Rohe Award | for MAS Museum aan de Stroom | 2011
Dutch Design Award | for MAS Museum aan de Stroom | 2011
BNA Cube | for international oeuvre | 2010
Nomination Mies van der Rohe Award | for Netherlands Institute for Sound and Vision | 2009
Nomination Mies van der Rohe Award | for Dutch Tax Office | 2009
Golden Pyramid Award | for Netherlands Institute for Sound and Vision | 2008
Concrete Award | for Netherlands Institute for Sound and Vision | 2007
Arie Keppler Award | for Netherlands Institute for Sound and Vision | 2007
Nomination Mies van der Rohe Award | for Shipping and Transport College | 2006
Belgian Building Award | for international oeuvre | 2006
Nomination Mies van der Rohe Award | for Lake Shore housing the Sphinxes | 2005
Award of the City of Rotterdam | Best building of the year Muller Pier Block 3 | 2004
Award of the City of Leuven | Best building of the year Performing Arts Centre STUK | 2003
Award of the City of Breda | Best building of the year Fire Station | 2000
Nomination for the Rietveld Award | for Minnaert University Building Utrecht | 1999
Rotterdam Maaskant Award | Best Young Architect under age 35 | 1991

Selected exhibitions
What Is Ornament? | Lisbon, Portugal | 2019
Mies van der Rohe Award 2015 | Brussels, Belgium | 2015
Models. Imagining to scale | Ghent, Belgium | 2014
The Fantastic Library | Moscow, Russia | 2013
Design Shanghai | Shanghai, China | 2013
Culture:City | Berlin, Germany | Graz, Austria | 2013
Centre Pompidou | Paris, France | 2012
AIT Behind the Curtains | Cologne, Germany | Munich, Germany | Hamburg, Germany | 2012-13
Mies van der Rohe Award 2009 | Essen, Germany | Madrid, Spain | Vienna, Austria | 2010
Lucky Dutch Festival | Moscow, Russia | 2009
Cité de l’Architecture et du Patrimoine | Paris, France | 2007 | 2012
International Architecture Biennale Rotterdam | Rotterdam, the Netherlands | 2005 | 2009
Global Polis | New York, USA | 2009
Skin between texture and frame | Paris, France | 2007
Skin and Bones | Los Angeles, USA | Tokyo, Japan | London, UK | 2006-08
Behind Curtains | Rotterdam, the Netherlands | Beijing, China | Brussels, Belgium | Prague, Czech Republic | Ljubljana, Slovenia | 2004-13
Beijing Architectural Biennial | 2004 | 2009
Architectural Biennale of Venice | Venice, Italy | 1991 | 2004
Panoramas Européens | Paris, France | 2001
10 Shades of Green | New York, USA | Austin, USA | Washington, USA | Houston, USA | 2000-02
Contemporary Architecture in Flanders | Venice Biennale | Rome, Italy | Grenoble, France | 2000

References

External links

Neutelings Riedijk Architects

Architecture firms of the Netherlands